Fenchurch could refer to:
Fenchurch Street, a street in the city of London
Fenchurch Street railway station, a railway station on that street
Fenchurch (The Hitchhiker's Guide to the Galaxy), a character from The Hitchhiker's Guide to the Galaxy, named after the railway station
Fenchurch (clothing), a clothing brand named after the railway station
 Fenchurch, one of the oldest working locomotives, built by William Stroudley and painted in his Improved Engine Green.